is a Japanese actor. Mizoguchi is also a member of the 5-dimensional idol group DearDream from DreamFes!

Biography
Mizoguchi made his acting debut in 2007. His appearance in the film Kamen Rider Den-O: I'm Born! published in the same year he played the rider Mini Den-O and the young Kotaro, and it became a topic when he was twelve years old.
In the Cho Den-O series that was deployed in 2009 and 2010 as the successor series of Den-O, rather than Takeru Satoh, Mizoguchi played the role of Ryotaro Nogami.

Filmography

TV dramas

Variety

Mobile drama

Films

Stage

Events

Advertisements

Radio

Internet

Anime television

Video games

Others

Works

CD

Image software

DreFes! image software

Books

References

External links
Takuya Mizoguchi - Amuse Official Profile 
 – Ameba Blog 
 
 

Japanese male child actors
Male actors from Tokyo
1995 births
Living people
21st-century Japanese male actors
Japanese male television actors
Japanese male film actors
Amuse Inc. talents
21st-century Japanese singers
21st-century Japanese male singers